UGC 8837 (also known as Holmberg IV) is a dwarf galaxy located in the constellation of Ursa Major, 24 million light years away from Earth. It is a member of the M101 Group, a group containing several galaxies orbiting the largest, the Pinwheel Galaxy (M101). 

It is possible UGC 8837 is one of the galaxies that interacted with the Pinwheel Galaxy and, together with NGC 5474 and NGC 5477, initiated a burst of star formation.

See also 
M101 Group, a group which UGC 8837 belongs
Pinwheel Galaxy, the central and largest galaxy in M101 group

References

External links 
 

8837
Ursa Major (constellation)
Irregular galaxies
M101 Group